Below is a list of nuclear powered aircraft and concepts:

References

Nuclear-powered aircraft
Nuclear-powered aircraft